Bill Twomey Jr. (28 September 1927 – 1 October 1996) was an Australian rules footballer, who played in the Victorian Football League (VFL).

Often described as an "enigma", Twomey was, for a time, considered the best centreman in the game. He combined freakish natural talent with exceptional speed, a vice-like grip and spectacular leap. His often perplexing career can be summed up by a three-week stretch during the latter part of the 1948 season. Twomey, having gone unsighted during the first half of Collingwood's semi-final clash versus Footscray, kicked 8 goals in the second half to single-handedly win the match for the Magpies. Such was his impact the Sporting Globe declared Twomey "their greatest match-winning forward since Ron Todd". Two weeks later the star Magpie had little to no influence in Collingwood's Preliminary final loss to Melbourne.

Twomey played 189 games for the Magpies over 14 seasons in a career that spanned a Copeland Trophy in 1956, Premiership glory in 1953, captaincy in 1957 and regular selection for Victoria. His time as a Magpie however was ultimately dogged by niggling injuries as well as personal setbacks, during an era when little thought was given to the mental welfare of footballers.

Bill's brother Michael played 157 games for the Woods between 1951 and 1961, while Pat had two brief stints with the club which amounted to 55 games.  The three brothers' nephew David – the son of a fourth brother, Peter Twomey – later played with the Magpies. Bill's father Bill Twomey Sr. had also played with them during the 1920s.

References

External links

Bio at Collingwood Forever

Australian rules footballers from Victoria (Australia)
Collingwood Football Club players
Collingwood Football Club Premiership players
Copeland Trophy winners
1927 births
1996 deaths
One-time VFL/AFL Premiership players